Huazhou, formerly romanized as Fachow or Fahsien, is a county-level city in southwestern Guangdong Province, China. Bordering Guangxi to the north, it is administrated as part of the prefecture-level city of Maoming. During the 2010 census, its population was 1,178,809, of which 320,418 were considered urban.

History

During the Three Kingdoms period, the area was organized as Guanghua County.

During the Song dynasty, the area became the seat of Hua Prefecture, Huazhou later became the seat of Hua County, which formed part of Gaozhou Commandery.

After the Chinese Civil War, it was reorganized and placed under the administration of Maoming.

In 1959, Hua County and Wuchuan County merged to become Huazhou County.

In 1994, Huazhou was changed from a county to a county-level city.

Climate
Huazhou has a humid subtropical climate, with a long lasting summer and short winter, which is influenced by the East Asian monsoon. The weather is warm and sunny. The mean annual temperature ranges from 22.2 °C to 23.9 °C, and the average yearly temperature is 22.9 °C. It is wet in summer with high temperature, high humidity while  mild and comparatively dry in winter. When the cold wave comes in winter, sometimes there severe cold days. Huazhou has an abundant precipitation and the average annual precipitation is 1890mm. But with an apparent monsoon climate, the rainfall displays an extremely uneven characteristic, mainly focus on summer and autumn. And typhoon, storm, flood are very frequent during summer and autumn, causing great damage to the local people's lives and property sometimes.

Administrative divisions
Huazhou has jurisdiction over 5 subdistricts, 17 towns, and 8 other township-level divisions.

Subdistricts 

Towns 

Other township-level divisions 
Huazhou also administers a number of other units which function as township-level divisions, including 1 development zone and 7 farms. The city's township-level farms are Xinshidai Farm, Hongyang Farm, Hongfeng Farm, Jianshe Farm, and Shitan Farm.

Economy 
As of 2019, the city's gross domestic product totaled ¥55.176 billion, and grew at an annualized rate of 4.3%. Of this, the primary sector accounted for ¥12.827 billion, or 23.2% of the economy, and grew at an annualized rate of 3.8%; the secondary sector accounted for ¥13.573 billion, or 24.6% of the economy, and shrunk at an annualized rate of 0.5%; the tertiary sector accounted for ¥28.776 billion, or 52.2% of the economy, and grew at an annualized rate of 7.4%.

Agriculture 
In 2019, Huazhou produced 337,800 tons of grain, a 3.6% annual increase, 730,000 tons of fruit, a 7.4% annual increase, and 691,000 tons of vegetables, an 8.4% increase.

Foreign trade 
The city reported ¥2.862 billion in foreign trade in 2019, a 28.0% increase from the previous year. Of this, Huazhou exported ¥2.818 billion in goods and services, while importing just ¥44 million in goods and services.

Industry 
Huazhou's industrial output declined in size in 2019 by 4.6%. This decline was led by a 17.3% decline in industrial output from firms classified as large by the city, while medium-sized enterprises saw a 4.5% increase in industrial output, and small enterprises saw a more moderate 3.3% decline in output. Huazhou's largest industry as of 2019 is in food processing, which added ¥1.457 billion to the local economy in 2019. The next three largest industries are the city's metallurgy industry, pharmaceutical industry, and mineral processing industry, which added ¥486 million, ¥411 million, and ¥222 million to the local economy, respectively.

Real estate 
The city's real estate industry saw ¥3.947 billion in investment in 2019, which represented a significant decrease from the previous year. Despite this, the total area of real estate sold in Huazhou in 2019 increased 0.8% from the previous year.

Retail sales 
Huazhou's total consumer retail sales in 2019 totaled ¥23.59 billion, which grew from previous years, with stronger growth in the city's urban areas.

Services 
The city's tertiary sector comprises the majority of the city's economic output in 2019, and grew faster than its primary and secondary sectors. In 2019, Huazhou saw significant growth in real estate services, logistical services, financial services, and other service industries.

Notes

References

External links
Official website of Huazhou Government

 
County-level cities in Guangdong
Maoming